Cyanoliseus is a genus of parrot that contains a single living species, the burrowing parrot (Cyanoliseus patagonus).

Two fossil species are known from the Pleistocene: Cyanoliseus patagonopsis and Cyanoliseus ensenadensis, which was formerly placed in Pionus. Both fossils have been found in Argentina and are among the few extinct prehistoric representatives of extant parrot genera.

References

Bird genera
Bird genera with one living species
Taxa named by Charles Lucien Bonaparte
Arini (tribe)